Avi Muchnick (born 1979) is an artist, author, programmer and entrepreneur.

In 2002, while attending Benjamin N. Cardozo School of Law, Muchnick co-founded the popular creative contest site Worth1000, together with Israel Derdik.

In 2007, he co-founded Aviary, a company that built an award-winning multimedia application suite of creative web apps, with Israel Derdik and Michael Galpert. In September 2011, citing stalling growth of the multimedia application suite, he shifted Aviary's business strategy to powering the photo-editing in third-party apps on web and mobile smart phones. Seeing enormous immediate growth, he chose to focus the company exclusively around this new direction and closed down Aviary's consumer-facing multimedia application suite, one year later on September 15, 2012. As of March 2013, Aviary announced passing 35 million monthly active users, 3,500 partners and 3 billion photos edited across its partner network. Muchnick served as CEO until December 2012, when he brought on former Walmart executive Tobias Peggs to take over, at which point he stepped into the Chief Product Officer role. On September 22, 2014, Aviary was acquired by Adobe Systems.

Muchnick was named one of the Top 35 Innovators Under 35 by MIT's Technology Review magazine in 2010.

Personal life
Prior to attending law school, Muchnick attended Queens College, where he served as Editor-in-Chief of the campus newspaper, and Marsha Stern Talmudical Academy. Muchnick lives on Long Island with his wife and 4 children.

References

External links
 Avi Muchnick's Personal Blog

Living people
American bloggers
20th-century American Jews
American technology chief executives
American corporate directors
American technology company founders
Businesspeople from New York City
Businesspeople in information technology
People from Long Island
Yeshiva University alumni
1979 births
21st-century American Jews